Grevillea acuaria is a species of flowering plant in the family Proteaceae and is endemic to the south-west of Western Australia. It is a rounded, bushy to erect shrub with spreading linear to narrowly elliptic leaves and red flowers arranged in small clusters.

Description

Taxonomy
Grevillea acuaria was first formally described in 1870 by George Bentham from an unpublished manuscript by Ferdinand von Mueller and the description was published in Flora Australiensis from material collected by James Drummond. The specific epithet (acuaria) means "possessing needles".

Distribution and habitat
This grevillea grows in a wide variety of habitats, often in winter-wet situations and is widespread in the Avon Wheatbelt, Coolgardie, Esperance Plains, Great Victoria Desert, Mallee, Murchison, Nullarbor and Yalgoo biogeographic regions of Western Australia.

References

acuaria
Endemic flora of Western Australia
Eudicots of Western Australia
Proteales of Australia
Taxa named by George Bentham
Taxa named by Ferdinand von Mueller
Plants described in 1870